The speaker of the National Assembly of Tanzania is the presiding officer of the National Assembly, the unicameral legislature of the United Republic of Tanzania.

List of speakers
Below is a list of the individuals who have held the role of Speaker of the National Assembly.

Hon Abdulkarim Yusufali Alibai Karimjee speaker 1953-1962

Parliament of Tanzania

See also
List of speakers of the National Assembly of Tanganyika

National Assembly (Tanzania)
Politics of Tanzania
Tanzania
Speakers of the National Assembly (Tanzania)